The 2009–10 season was Inter Milan's 101st in existence and 94th consecutive season in the top flight of Italian football. This was manager José Mourinho's second and final season with the club, before his departure to Real Madrid.

Inter had the greatest season in their history, winning Serie A for the fifth consecutive season on the final matchday, the Coppa Italia, and the UEFA Champions League for the first time in 45 years, completing a historic treble. Inter became the sixth European club to complete a treble and the first and only Italian club to achieve this feat to date.

Season overview
The main transfer move was an exchange with Barcelona, as Zlatan Ibrahimović and Samuel Eto'o swapped clubs. From a tactical point of view, the line-up was not made up from this fact: Eto'o was himself a centre-forward. His partner was Diego Milito, acquired from Genoa, like the midfielder Thiago Motta. There were also the arrivals of the centre-back Lúcio and the playmaker Wesley Sneijder. Inter unveiled the season losing the Supercoppa Italiana, due to a 2–1 knockout against Lazio.

During the brief pause in September, Inter had four points in the league, which became 16 before the October pause. Meanwhile, the side had started its European adventure (from group phase) drawing in the first part of the stage: it was renamed the "group of death" due to the presences of only national champions, from Spain (Barcelona, who was the European defending champion), Ukraine (Dynamo Kyiv) and Russia (Rubin Kazan). Inter retained the first place in Serie A without obstacles and managed to recover the Champions League gap, finishing the group in second place behind Barcelona. In the round of 16, they defeated Chelsea (the club that José Mourinho coached from 2004 to 2007) via a 3–1 aggregate; in the quarter-finals, CSKA Moscow was beaten 1–0 in both legs. The last obstacle toward the final resulted – once again – Barcelona. Four days before the first leg, Inter won 2–0 over Juventus. The Spanish side lost the first leg, despite having scored the first goal (with Pedro): the final score was 3–1, enough for Inter to progress to the final despite a 1–0 loss in the second leg, and down to 10 men with a red card to Thiago Motta. As result, Inter went to their first UEFA final in 12 years since the 1998 UEFA Cup.

Prior to the final, Mourinho added two trophies to the season: a Coppa Italia and the second consecutive Scudetto, both won due to Milito's goals and leaving Roma behind. Milito was also man of the match for Champions League final, scoring both goals in the 2–0 victory whereby Inter defeated Bayern Munich, winning this trophy for the first time since 1965, and for the third overall. Inter became the first Italian club to achieve the Treble.

Players

Transfers
Confirmed transfers 2009–10

In 

Total spending:  €89.05 million

Out 

Total income:  €97 million

Out on loan

Club

Non-playing staff

Pre-season and friendlies

World Football Challenge

TIM Trophy

Other friendlies

Competitions

Overview

Supercoppa Italiana

Serie A

League table

Results summary

Results by round

Matches

Coppa Italia

UEFA Champions League

Group stage

Knockout phase

Round of 16

Quarter-finals

Semi-finals

Final

Statistics

Squad statistics
{|class="wikitable" style="text-align: center;"
|-
!
! style="width:70px;"|Serie A
! style="width:70px;"|Champions League
! style="width:70px;"|Coppa Italia
! style="width:70px;"|Supercoppa Italiana
! style="width:70px;"|Total Stats
|-
|align=left|Games played       || 38 || 13 || 5 || 1 || 57
|-
|align=left|Games won          || 24 || 8  || 5 || 0 || 37
|-
|align=left|Games drawn        || 10 || 3  || 0 || 0 || 13
|-
|align=left|Games lost         || 4  || 2  || 0 || 1 || 7
|-
|align=left|Goals scored       || 75 || 17 || 6 || 1 || 99
|-
|align=left|Goals conceded     || 34 || 9  || 1 || 2 || 46
|-
|align=left|Goal difference    || 41 || 8  || 5 || –1 || 53
|-
|align=left|Clean sheets       || 17 || 6 || 4 || 0 || 27
|-
|align=left|Goal by substitute || 4  || – || – || – || 4
|-
|align=left|Total shots        || – || – || – || –|| –
|-
|align=left|Shots on target    || – || – || – || –|| –
|-
|align=left|Corners            || – || – || – || –|| –
|-
|align=left|Players used       || 26 || 23 || 22 || 14 || –
|-
|align=left|Offsides           || – || – || – || –|| –
|-
|align=left|Fouls suffered     || – || – || – || –|| –
|-
|align=left|Fouls committed    || – || – || – || –|| –
|-
|align=left|Yellow cards       || 83 || 30 || 11 || 3 || 127
|-
|align=left|Red cards          || 7 || 2 || 1 || – || 10
|-

Appearances and goals

Goalscorers

Disciplinary record

.

References

Inter Milan seasons
Inter Milan
UEFA Champions League-winning seasons
Italian football championship-winning seasons